mBio is a bimonthly peer-reviewed open access scientific journal published by the American Society for Microbiology in association with the American Academy of Microbiology. It covers all aspects of the microbiological sciences, including virology, bacteriology, parasitology, mycology, and allied fields. The journal was established in 2010 with Arturo Casadevall as founding editor-in-chief.

Abstracting and indexing
The journal is abstracted and indexed in:

According to the Journal Citation Reports, the journal has a 2021 impact factor of 7.786.

References

External links

Microbiology journals
Publications established in 2010
Bimonthly journals
English-language journals
American Society for Microbiology academic journals